Raja Chulan Monorail station is a Malaysian elevated monorail train station that serves as a part of the Kuala Lumpur Monorail (KL Monorail), located in Kuala Lumpur and opened alongside the rest of the monorail service on August 31, 2003.

The Raja Chulan station is located closer to the northern side of the Kuala Lumpur Golden Triangle, a designated commercial hub in the city. The station is also situated over Jalan Sultan Ismail, stopping between several commercial skyscrapers directly north from the Sultan Ismail-Changkat Raja Chulan intersection. The station has two exits to both sides of Sultan Ismail Road, and is apparently named after Jalan Raja Chulan.

The station is one of four Kuala Lumpur Monorail stations that serves the Kuala Lumpur Golden Triangle locality, the other three being the Bukit Bintang station (500 metres away), the Imbi station, and the Hang Tuah station (connected to the STAR LRT lines). The Bukit Nanas station is situated 1 kilometre north.

Around the station
 Impiana KLCC Hotel

See also
 List of rail transit stations in Klang Valley

Kuala Lumpur Monorail stations
Railway stations opened in 2003